German rapper Farid Bang has released nine studio albums, five collaboration albums, two mixtapes, three extended plays, 50 singles and 67 music videos. Bang was awarded for sales of 415,000 records in both Germany and Austria.

Albums

Studio albums

Collaborative albums

Compilation albums 
<onlyinclude>

Mixtapes 
<onlyinclude>

Extended plays

Singles

As lead artist

As featured artist

Other charted songs

Free tracks

References

External links 
 www.faridbang.com

Hip hop discographies